Marleen Gorris (born 9 December 1948) is a Dutch writer and director. Gorris is known as an outspoken feminist and supporter of gay and lesbian issues which is reflected in much of her work. Her film, Antonia's Line, won an Oscar for Best Foreign Language Film in 1995  making her first woman to do so in this category. She has won 2 Golden Calf awards and received numerous other nominations, including one nomination for BAFTA Awards.

Early life
Marleen Gorris was born on 9 December 1948 in Roermond in the Netherlands. She was born to Protestant, working-class parents in the Catholic southern part of the Netherlands. Gorris studied drama at home and abroad. She studied drama at the University of Amsterdam and has an MA in Drama from the University of Birmingham, England.

She began working as a filmmaker with almost no previous experience in the cinema and made an auspicious writing and directorial debut in 1982 with A Question of Silence. The Dutch government provided the funding to finance the project.

Career
It was not until the age of 30 that Gorris began writing scripts. She took her first effort to the Belgian filmmaker Chantal Akerman, hoping to interest her in directing it. Akerman, however, told Gorris that she must make the film herself. The result, A Question of Silence (1982), caused considerable international controversy telling a story through the eyes of a female psychiatrist whose job it was to question three women who had spontaneously murdered a man for the sole reason of him being a man. Some interpreted the film's feminist message to be about pent up "female rage" and dissatisfaction with a patriarchal system that boiled over the surface while other claimed it went too far and couldn't be taken seriously. The film was well received for its quality but still shocked many who watched it for its lack of condemnation of the murderers. At the Netherlands' Film Festival in 1982 she was awarded the Golden Calf for Best Feature Film for A Question of Silence, a feat she would repeat in 1995 winning Best Direction for her well known film Antonia's Line.

Soon after the success of her first film, Gorris released her second: Broken Mirrors (1984). The film hold similarities to A Question of Silence both in production and in theme though many found Broken Mirrors less impactful. Large portions of the cast and crew, including the leading women, crossed over to work on this with her. The film follows two parallel plots. The first of women working in a brothel called Club Happy House and the second of a woman kidnapped and starved to death by an unnamed man for his pleasure. Broken Mirrors explores female viewpoint and experiences just like A Question of Silence, though this time with a larger focus on the oppressive nature of the patriarchy and power dynamics within it. The ending of the film proposed that a defense against these powers are unity and solidarity among women though this sentiment did not resonate for everyone. She did not make another film until The Last Island (1990). The film yet again tells a story of violence where a group of plane crash survivors are marooned on an island. the men turn on each other until only the two women remain alone and stranded.

In 1995, Gorris had her greatest international success to-date with Antonia's Line. Starring Willeke van Ammelrooy, the story of an independent woman and her female descendants was not as radical as the director's previous work, although a number of critics complained that the men in the film were portrayed as either ineffectual idiots or potential rapists. However, critical support for the film was overwhelming, and it was honored with a number of international awards, including a Golden Calf and an Academy Award for Best Foreign Film.

Her next film was Mrs Dalloway (1997), based on the novel by Virginia Woolf, with a cast that included Vanessa Redgrave, Natascha McElhone, and Rupert Graves. It earned a number of international honors, including an Evening Standard British Film Award. She followed this movie with The Luzhin Defence (2000), based on a novel by Vladimir Nabokov. Starring John Turturro and Emily Watson, it tells the story of the love affair between an eccentric chess champion and a strong-willed society woman. Carolina (2003), starring Julia Stiles, Shirley MacLaine, and Alessandro Nivola, was released direct-to-video in 2005.

Gorris's 2009 film Within the Whirlwind, starring Emily Watson, was not picked up for distribution. According to Watson, "It was delivered pretty much the day the market crashed so nobody was buying anything."

Personal life
Marleen Gorris came out as a lesbian after the success of Antonia's Line. Her partner, Maria Uitdehaag, served in its production as first assistant director, and was mentioned by Gorris in her Academy Award acceptance speech.

Filmography

Film

Television

Awards and nominations

See also
 List of female film and television directors
 List of lesbian filmmakers
 List of LGBT-related films directed by women

References

External links
 
 
 
 Marleen Gorris Awards at IMDb

1948 births
Living people
Dutch feminists
Dutch film directors
Dutch screenwriters
Dutch women film directors
Dutch women screenwriters
Dutch lesbian artists
LGBT film directors
Dutch LGBT screenwriters
People from Roermond
University of Amsterdam alumni
Alumni of the University of Birmingham
Golden Calf winners
Directors of Best Foreign Language Film Academy Award winners
Lesbian screenwriters
Dutch lesbian writers